The Melody of Rhythm is a 2009 album by banjoist Béla Fleck. After returning from Africa and recording Tales From The Acoustic Planet, Vol. 3: Africa Sessions, Fleck put together the musical trio, consisting of him, tabla player Zakir Hussain and bassist Edgar Meyer to record this album. They are accompanied by the Detroit Symphony Orchestra, conducted by Leonard Slatkin.

Track listing 
 "Babar" (Hussain)
 "Out of the Blue" (Fleck, Hussain, Meyer)
 "Bubbles" (Fleck)
 "The Melody of Rhythm: Movement 1" (Fleck, Hussain, Meyer)
 "The Melody of Rhythm: Movement 2" (Fleck, Hussain, Meyer)
 "The Melody of Rhythm: Movement 3" (Fleck, Hussain, Meyer)
 "Cadence" (Fleck, Hussain, Meyer)
 "In Conclusion" (Fleck, Hussain, Meyer)
 "Then Again" (Meyer)

Personnel 
 Béla Fleck - banjo
 Zakir Hussain - Tabla
 Edgar Meyer - bass
 Detroit Symphony Orchestra

References 

Béla Fleck albums
2009 classical albums